Milius is a 2013 documentary film about the writer, producer, director John Milius, directed by Joey Figueroa and Zak Knutson.

Plot
A look at the life and career of John Milius, from his childhood and days as a student at USC, to his success as a writer and director on major films like Dirty Harry, Apocalypse Now and Red Dawn.

Select interviewees

Production
The film took five and a half years to make. The filmmakers were two and a half years into the project when Scott Mosier came on board with Matt Perniciero and Kevin Mann as executive producers to provide additional finance. Then Milius had a stroke and the film shut down for nine months while he started rehab.

According to co director Joey Figueroa:
Usually a lot of people will do a big documentary and they don't have their subject fully on board. We had John Milius on board from the get-go. And we were like, 'Wow! This man can speak. And this is going to be amazing, because he's so vocal and has like zero filter and he's just going to say all this shit that's going to be awesome'. And, obviously, if you've seen the film, you know what happens, so that changed the entire dynamic of how this documentary got made. Originally Milius was going to be our driving force in this picture and that totally got derailed. And we had to find this voice now, because we have to hear him speak, obviously. That's what made it a bit more difficult.

References

External links

Review of film at Ain't It Cool News

2013 films
2013 documentary films
Biographical documentary films
2010s English-language films